Love Does Not Love is a 2014 Russian romantic comedy film is a relationship cheating. The film is directed by Klim Shipenko, stars Maksim Matveyev, Lyubov Aksyonova, and Svetlana Khodchenkova.

Plot 
Aleksey is a young ambitious man preparing for his wedding with Alyona, 
She is a sweet and kind girl who loves him. In addition, Alyona is the daughter of his boss. Before making an offer, Aleksey asks for the chef’s blessing. He agrees, and also insistently hints that Alyona always wanted to hear “Marry Me“ in Paris, on the Eiffel Tower. Aleksey is not against Paris, but he is terribly afraid of heights. However, he buys a ring and tickets to France.

However, on the eve of the trip, the boss sends him to work in Saint Petersburg. In the Northern capital on the street he is harassed by a blonde who asks to donate to the musicians. But she refuses, then the girl begins to read poetry to him.

Soon we see that this girl is actually an authoritative and famous Moscow journalist Irina, who writes on the topic of fashion, openly despises her work in a cool magazine, and secretly writes reverent poems that she has the courage to send only to her friend in her beloved Paris. Ira is beautiful, independent, bitchy and lonely.

The meeting with Ira drops Aleksey's suspicion that he is not strong and loves his kind and charming Alyona. But he still flies to Paris, where Alyona, who arrived a day earlier, is already waiting for him. On the plane, Aleksey meets Irina, who also goes to Paris to cover Fashion Week. He is surprised. Passengers get drunk and stuck in the toilet room, where they went with the intention of smoking. They are detained by the police, but then released. At the airport, Alyona sees Irina with Aleksey, but she is not jealous, she sincerely admires Irina's articles.

Despite doubts, Aleksey makes an offer to Alyona at the Eiffel Tower. She says yes. Returning to Moscow, the groom is tormented by feelings of sympathy for Irina and calls her. Irina says that she is in Saint Petersburg. Aleksey, telling Alyona that he was going on a business trip, rushing to St. Petersburg. In the Northern capital, Irina and Aleksey understand that they cannot be together because of the groom's obligations to Alyona. But as a result of ridiculous coincidence, they cannot part (they lose their luggage, then the keys to the hotel room, etc.).

Aleksey lies to Alyona that his grandmother is ill. The situation is complicated by the arrival of Alyona's father in St. Petersburg, who not only stays in the same hotel as his son-in-law, but also falls in love with Irina. Worried about the groom's grandmother, Alyona is also in St. Petersburg.

In the end, Ira refuses Aleksey, because she does not want to spoil the life and psyche of such a good and young girl as Alyona (so that she does not get burned). She decides to quit her unloved job and fly to Paris to write poetry.

Sensitive and kind Alyona, passionate about preparations for the wedding, can not help noticing the change of mood of the groom. You don't love me? —  she asks him just the day before the wedding. Hearing in response to the silence, Alyona understands and noble lets go of Aleksey. He gets on a plane to Paris, where the Ira is sitting. He says he won't marry. They happily walk the streets and kiss.

Alyona also takes Irina's place in a cool magazine, because for her it is just her dream job.

Cast 
 Maksim Matveyev as Aleksey, a successful entrepreneur
 Lyubov Aksyonova as Alyona, Aleksey's fiancee
 Svetlana Khodchenkova as Irina, journalist
 Yekaterina Vasilyeva as Aleksey's grandmother
 Sergey Gazarov as Mikhail, Alyona's father
  as Marat, Aleksey's friend
 Yuri Kolokolnikov as Dima, Aleksey's friend

Release and criticism 
The premiere took place on 4 December 2014 in Russia. The film earned $2.3 million at the box office.

References

External links 
 Official website at Yellow, Black and White
 
Любит не любит on KinoPoisk  

2014 romantic comedy films
Russian romantic comedy films
Films about journalists
Films directed by Klim Shipenko
2010s Russian-language films